Turnu Ruieni is a commune in Caraș-Severin County, western Romania with a population of 3663 people. It is composed of six villages: Borlova (Borló), Cicleni (Csiklény), Dalci (Dálcs), Turnu Ruieni, Zervești (Szervesd) and Zlagna (Szalakna). Turnu Ruieni is situated in the historical region of Banat.

References

External links
"Turnul „lui Ovidiu”, între istorie şi legendă…" (in Romanian)

Communes in Caraș-Severin County
Localities in Romanian Banat